The Kędzierzyn Zero-Emission Power and Chemical Complex was a proposed facility in Kędzierzyn-Koźle, Poland.  It was planned to combine the functions of power and heat generation with chemical production and carbon capture and storage. The project was proposed by a consortium of chemicals producers, including Zakłady Azotowe Kędzierzyn and the electricity company Południowy Koncern Energetyczny. The facility would have produced synthesis gas by gasification of hard coal. Gas produced by the plant would have been used for power and heat generation, or for the production of other chemicals. The carbon dioxide (CO2) produced by this plant would have been stored in natural geological reservoirs, or used as a raw material for the production of synthesis fuels, fertilizers or plastics.

The project has since been discontinued for lack of funding, due in part to the low carbon price as CCS investments generally do not provide large incentives.

Concept 
Zero carbon emissions were planned to be achieved through a combination of integrated gasification combined cycle and carbon capture and storage, as well as the supplement of up to 10% of the biomass during the combustion process.  Generated CO2 would be utilized by depositing it underground in the deep layers of porous located at the depth of over one kilometer (in rock of the Jurassic and Triassic period) and by chemical sequestration of CO2 in methanol, urea and other chemical products. The total reduction of CO2 emissions will amount to nearly three million tons annually (92%). Taking into account the biomass as a renewable energy source excluded from the carbon balance, a negative CO2 emissions could theoretically be achieved.

Technical specifications

Gasification of coal
Coal could be converted into synthesis gas by the integrated gasification, combined cycle technology. CO2 separation would be required in order to obtain a gas composition adequate for further processing. As a result of the gas purification process, the obtained CO2 would have a concentration of up to 99%, which permits its commercial use or storage.

Polygeneration
The demonstration plant will be generating electricity and thermal power, while CO2 will be sequestrated and purified for the production of carbon-chemical products or stored underground. Two gasification reactors of identical capacity can be used in an exchangeable way in order to either adapt to enhanced needs in the production of synthesis gas or the generation of electric energy.

Pre-combustion carbon capture and storage
The use of integrated gasification combined cycle technology allows to remove the carbon content of coal before burning it (pre-combustion carbon capture). As a consequence, the costs of carbon capture are reduced as the only costs that occur are the carbon compression and its transport to an underground storage. There are no additional separation costs which are usually very high in post-combustion carbon capture. CO2 is injected more than one kilometre underground into porous Jurassic and Triassic sandstones. The biggest of these four areas can store up to 30 million tonnes of CO2.

Chemical sequestration and carbon-chemical production
Around 23% of CO2 will be used and thus permanently captured in chemical products such as methanol, fertilizers or polycarbonates. The chemical sequestration of CO2 takes place as part of the carbon-dioxide, which would normally have been emitted, is used for the chemical industry. Taking into account both the pre-combustion carbon capture as well as the chemical sequestration, a total reduction of 92% of potential CO2 emissions can be achieved.

Technical parameters 

Units and abbreviations used are:
 Mtonne: Million tonnes
 ktonne: Thousand tonnes
 Gm3: Billions cubic metre

Developers 
The project is developed through cooperation of chemicals producer Zakłady Azotowe Kędzierzyn and electricity company Południowy Koncern Energetyczny.

Media response 
The technically innovative concept of the Kędzierzyn Zero-Emission Plant was received with great interest by the international press, such as the New York Times, the Guardian, or EurActiv.

References

External links

 Carbon Sequestration Leadership Forum
 Berlin Forum on Fossil Fuels
 European Network of Excellence on Geological Storage of CO2
 Carbon Dioxide Knowledge Transfer Network
 European Technology Platform for Zero Emission Fossil Fuel Power Plants
 CO2NET EAST (Information portal for CO2 capture and storage technologies)
 European Commission, DG Research - Introduction to CO2 capture and storage
 Fossil Energy Coalition
 EurActiv - Carbon capture and storage
 IEA Greenhouse Gas R&D Programme - CO2 capture and storage
 CORDIS - Clean Coal Technologies

Coal-fired power stations in Poland
Proposed coal-fired power stations
Kędzierzyn-Koźle County
Proposed power stations in Poland
Plant